Buildings, sites, districts, and objects in New York listed on the National Register of Historic Places:

There are over 6,000 properties and districts listed on the National Register of Historic Places in New York State. Some are listed within each one of the 62 counties in New York State. Of these, 264 are further designated as National Historic Landmarks.



Numbers of properties and districts
The numbers of properties and districts in New York State or in any of its 62 counties are not reported by the National Register. Following are approximate tallies of current listings from lists of the specific properties and districts.

See also

List of National Historic Landmarks in New York
List of bridges on the National Register of Historic Places in New York
New York State Office of Parks, Recreation and Historic Preservation

References

External links

National Register of Historic Places applications for New York State
National Register of Historic Places travel itineraries:
Shaker historic trail  
Places Where Women Made History
Historic Places of the civil rights movement
Aboard the Underground Railroad 
Aviation: From sand dunes to sonic booms

 
New York